Gary Sinyor (born Manchester, England, 1962) is an English film director, producer, and writer.

Sinyor was raised in a Sephardic Jewish upbringing, before going on to the National Film and Television School. As the co-writer, co-producer, and co-director of Leon the Pig Farmer he shared the FIPRESCI International Critics' Prize at the 1992 Venice Film Festival, the Chaplin Award for the best first feature from the 1992 Edinburgh International Film Festival, the 1994 Best Newcomer award from the London Critics' Circle, and the Most Promising Newcomer from the 1994 Evening Standard British Film Awards. He has since attempted to dissociate himself from the Chaplin award, after becoming involved in a dispute between the Edinburgh Festival and the Israeli Embassy.

The 2002 DVD release of Leon the Pig Farmer also included Sinyor's writing debut The Unkindest Cut, which had been nominated for a BAFTA as Best Short Film in 1989.

His first play NotMoses opened in London's West End in March 2016 at the Arts Theatre.

In 2017 he wrote, directed and produced a psychological thriller The Unseen. It was released on 15 December 2017.

In 2020, his TV series The Jewish Enquirer was released in the UK and USA. It stars Tim Downie, Lucy Montgomery, Josh Howie and Geoff McGivern.

Filmography

References

External links
 
 {https://www.screamhorrormag.com/seeing-unseen-interview-gary-sinyor/}
 http://lwlies.com/reviews/the-unseen/
 https://www.flickeringmyth.com/2017/11/movie-review-the-unseen-2017/
 https://www.radiotimes.com/film/fxrbhh/the-unseen/

1962 births
Living people
English film directors
English film producers
English Jews
English screenwriters
English male screenwriters
Alumni of the National Film and Television School